Patrick Erras (born 21 January 1995) is a German professional footballer who plays as a midfielder for Holstein Kiel.

Club career

1. FC Nürnberg
Erras began his career at age five at local club SV Raigering, before moving to the 1. FC Nürnberg youth academy in 2007. As part of the under-17 side, he won the Under 17 Bundesliga championship for the South/Southwest Region in the 2011–12 season. Two years later, as part of the under-19 team, he reached promotion to the Under 19 Bundesliga. For the 2014–15 season, Erras was promoted to the reserve team who competed in the Regionalliga Bayern, the fourth tier of the German football league system and the highest regional league. He scored his first goal for the reserve team on 15 August 2014 in a 1–3 home loss to 1. FC Schweinfurt 05.

Erras was included in the first-team squad for the first time for a 2. Bundesliga matchup against Greuther Fürth on 13 September 2015, however without making an appearance. On 17 October, he made his 2. Bundesliga debut against FSV Frankfurt playing the full game. On 7 November, in an away match against 1. FC Union Berlin, Erras scored his first goal which tied the game 3–3. A month later, in December 2015, he signed a contract extension with 1. FC Nürnberg. On 17 March 2016, Erras tore the ACL in his right knee in practice, sidelining him for at least a year. He made his comeback the following season, helping Nürnberg reach second place in the league table and reaching promotion to the Bundesliga.

Werder Bremen
In July 2020, Erras joined Bundesliga club Werder Bremen on a free transfer. He signed a three-year contract. In the 2020–21 season he made seven appearances totalling 87 minutes.

Holstein Kiel
Erras moved to Holstein Kiel in July 2021, having agreed a three-year contract.

Career statistics

References

External links
 

1995 births
Living people
People from Amberg
Sportspeople from the Upper Palatinate
German footballers
Footballers from Bavaria
Association football midfielders
Bundesliga players
2. Bundesliga players
Regionalliga players
1. FC Nürnberg players
SV Werder Bremen players
Holstein Kiel players